This article lists the Costa Rica national football team results. The national team is organised by the Federación Costarricense de Fútbol that was established in 1921.  The team is nicknamed La Sele or Los Ticos. Costa Rica joined FIFA in 1927 and CONCACAF in 1962.

Results

Prior to 1990

1990–1999
98 matches played:

2000–2009
130 matches played:

2010–2019

See also
Costa Rica at the Copa América

References